War of the Worlds Tour was a professional wrestling tour that was co-produced by Ring of Honor (ROH) and New Japan Pro-Wrestling (NJPW).

Production

Background
In 2014, NJPW and ROH formally forged a relationship, which saw them present the first War of the Worlds show on May 17, 2014, at the Hammerstein Ballroom in New York City, New York. The following year, War of the Worlds was held over two days at the 2300 Arena in Philadelphia, Pennsylvania and in 2016 it was expanded to a three-show tour with shows taking place in Dearborn, Michigan, Toronto, Ontario and New York City. The 2017 War of the Worlds tour was held from May 7 to 14. 
In February 2018,  NJPW and ROH announced War of the Worlds Tour, a four-show collaborative tour taking place in Lowell, Massachusetts, Toronto, Ontario, Royal Oak, Michigan, and Villa Park, Illinois.

Storylines
War of the Worlds Tour will feature professional wrestling matches that involve different wrestlers from pre-existing scripted feuds and storylines. Wrestlers will portray villains, heroes, or less distinguishable characters in the scripted events that will build tension and culminate in a wrestling match or a series of matches.

Results

Night 1

Night 2

Night 3

Night 4

See also

Professional wrestling in Canada
2018 in professional wrestling

References

External links
Official New Japan Pro-Wrestling website 
Official Ring of Honor website

2018 in professional wrestling
Tour
Professional wrestling in Toronto
May 2018 events in North America
Professional wrestling in Massachusetts
Professional wrestling in Michigan
Entertainment events in Massachusetts
Events in Toronto
Events in Michigan
Events in Villa Park, Illinois
2018 in Massachusetts
2018 in Toronto
2018 in Michigan
2010s in Chicago
2018 in Illinois
History of Lowell, Massachusetts